The southern highland tree frog (Dryophytes euphorbiaceus) is a species of frog in the family Hylidae endemic to Mexico. Its natural habitats are subtropical or tropical moist montane forests, subtropical or tropical high-altitude grassland, intermittent rivers, and intermittent freshwater marshes.
It is threatened by habitat loss.

References

Dryophytes
Amphibians described in 1859
Taxa named by Albert Günther
Taxonomy articles created by Polbot